Thomas & Sarah is a British drama series that aired on ITV in 1979. A spin-off from the BAFTA Award-winning series Upstairs, Downstairs, it stars John Alderton and Pauline Collins reprising their Upstairs, Downstairs roles.

Background
Following the end of Upstairs, Downstairs in 1975 there were many ideas for spin-offs, and the idea for Thomas & Sarah was originally given the name In Confidence by Alfred Shaughnessy and John Hawkesworth. At a memorial service for Cyril Bennett, the LWT Controller who had died in November 1976, his successor Michael Grade agreed to do a programme with John Alderton and Pauline Collins, now a celebrated television couple, reprising their former roles. In October 1977, John Hawkesworth was commissioned to write a synopsis for the programme, and it was filmed from September 1978 to March 1979. The writers, many of whom had worked on Upstairs, Downstairs, were Terence Brady and Charlotte Bingham, Alfred Shaughnessy, Jeremy Paul, Anthony Skene, Alick Rowe and Angharad Lloyd.

Plot
Thomas & Sarah follows the adventures of Thomas Watkins, the chauffeur, and Sarah, the house and nursery maid, after leaving service at Eaton Place in 1910. Sarah is pregnant, and according to their last episode of Upstairs, Downstairs they have married, but according to Thomas & Sarah they "never got round to it". In addition, a two-part short story, entitled The Spin of the Wheel, that bridges the gap between them leaving Eaton Place and the start of Thomas & Sarah, was written by Alfred Shaughnessy and published in the TV Times in the 23 December and 6 January issues.

Episodes

Cliffhanger
The last minutes of the first series saw Sarah mourning at a graveside. The public were not to know whether this was Thomas or Richard de Brassey, her last employer, but the public knew that a second series had been commissioned, so it was clear that it couldn't have been Thomas in the grave.

Second series
The public reaction to the series was good enough to have a second series commissioned, and some location work was filmed in July 1979. However, a strike at ITV meant work was halted and never finished. The location work has since been wiped. The names of four of the episodes are known, "Where There's A Will"''', "For Richer, For Poorer", "Favours" and "Flying the Foam". Again, these were written by Terence Brady & Charlotte Bingham and Jeremy Paul.

Novelisations
Like Upstairs, Downstairs, novelisations of the series were written. The first book, titled simply Thomas & Sarah, was published in 1978 by Sphere Books and covers the first seven episodes of the programme. The second book, titled Thomas & Sarah: Two for a Spin, was also published by Sphere Books and released in 1979. Both books were written by Mollie Hardwick, who also wrote many Upstairs, Downstairs books.

Home releasesThomas & Sarah was released in Region 2 (UK) by VCI in 2004. This followed releases of all episodes of Upstairs, Downstairs by VCI in similar packaging. VCI stopped making copies of the DVDs in 2005. The whole series was released by Network DVD on 16 April 2007, Network having previously released all episodes of Upstairs, Downstairs.

A&E Home Video released the entire series on DVD in Region 1 on 27 April 2004.

In 2012 Acorn Media re-released the series (as they had Upstairs, Downstairs'' in 2006 with DVD commentaries) in a 4-disc DVD set indicating the best possible digital resolution was attained in conjunction with the age of the series and the technology (1978–79) used to make it. There is no DVD commentary from either Alderton or Collins or surviving cast or crew.

References

Bibliography
Richard Marson, "Inside UpDown - The Story of Upstairs, Downstairs", Kaleidoscope Publishing, 2005

External links

1970s British drama television series
1979 British television series debuts
1979 British television series endings
British drama television series
British television spin-offs
Fictional couples
ITV television dramas
London Weekend Television shows
Television series by ITV Studios
Upstairs, Downstairs